Raymond William Harrison (21 June 1921 – June 2000) was an English professional association footballer who played as a centre forward in the Football League for Burnley, Doncaster Rovers and Grimsby Town. Harrison is best remembered for scoring the winning goal for Burnley in an FA Cup semi-final.

In his later career he managed Frickley Colliery in the Midland League and ran a sports shop in Doncaster.

References

External links

1921 births
2000 deaths
People from Boston, Lincolnshire
English footballers
Association football forwards
Burnley F.C. players
Doncaster Rovers F.C. players
Grimsby Town F.C. players
King's Lynn F.C. players
Frickley Athletic F.C. players
English Football League players
Frickley Athletic F.C. managers
English football managers
FA Cup Final players